Carrington is an English surname.

Carrington may also refer to:

Places

In Australia
 Carrington, Queensland, Australia, a locality near Atherton
 Carrington, New South Wales, Australia, a suburb of Newcastle
 Carrington, New South Wales (Mid-Coast Council), Australia, a locality
 Carrington Falls, New South Wales, a waterfall
 Carrington Street, a street in Adelaide

In Barbados
 Carrington, Saint Philip, Barbados, a village

In Great Britain
 Carrington, Greater Manchester, a village and civil parish
 Carrington Moss, a large area of peat bog near Carrington, Greater Manchester
 Carrington, Lincolnshire, a village and civil parish
 Carrington, Midlothian, a village
 Carrington, Nottingham, Nottinghamshire, a small suburb of Nottingham

In the United States
 Carrington, Missouri, an unincorporated community
 Carrington, North Dakota,  a city

On the Moon
 Carrington (crater), a lunar crater

Schools
 Carrington College, Otago (opened 1945), Residential College at the University of Otago in New Zealand
 Carrington College (US), a network of for-profit private colleges in the western United States
 Carrington High School, North Dakota, United States
 Carrington Middle School, Durham County, North Carolina, United States
 Carrington School, a secondary school in Redhill, Surrey, England

Arts and entertainment
 Dora Carrington (1893–1932), British artist typically known simply as "Carrington"
 Carrington (film) (1995), British biographical film about Dora Carrington
 Carrington V.C. (play) (1953), British legal drama
 Carrington V.C. (film) (1955)

Other
 Baron Carrington, three titles, one each in the Peerage of England, Ireland and Great Britain
 Viscount Carrington, a title in the Peerage of Ireland
 Carrington, Trafford Training Centre, training ground of Manchester United F.C.
 Carrington railway station, former railway station in Carrington, Nottingham

See also 
 Carrington Event, or Solar storm of 1859, named for astronomer Richard Christopher Carrington